Tree of Life is an outdoor 1964 sculpture by Lee Kelly and Bonnie Bronson, with additional assistance from John Jelly and architect John Murtaugh, installed on the exterior of the University of Portland's Mehling Hall, in Portland, Oregon, United States.

Description
Tree of Life is an abstract metal sculpture depicting of tree with stylized branches and leaves. It is made of nickel silver and stainless steel, enameled blue and green, and measures approximately  x  x . The Smithsonian Institution categorizes the sculpture as an allegorical representation of life, and says the tree is a "Christian symbol of growth, fruitfulness, spiritual evolution and diversity among unity".

History
The sculpture was commissioned by the University of Portland for the women's dormitory in 1964, and dedicated on November 22.

Tree of Life was surveyed as part of Smithsonian's "Save Outdoor Sculpture!" program in 1993.

See also

 1964 in art

References

1964 establishments in Oregon
1964 sculptures
Abstract sculptures in Oregon
Allegorical sculptures in Oregon
Metal sculptures
Outdoor sculptures in Portland, Oregon
Sculptures by Lee Kelly
Stainless steel sculptures in Oregon
University of Portland campus